Olympia Chopsonidou: born 17 June 1983) is a Greek model. In April 2006, Chopsonidou won the title of Star Hellas, and she then represented Greece at the Miss Universe 2006 pageant, which was held in Los Angeles, California.

Biography
Chopsonidou was born on 17 June 1983 in Krasnodar, USSR to Greek parents Emilia and Vasilis Chopsonidis. She has three siblings, Tasos (born. 1981), Valeria (born 1988) and Giannis (born 1989). She grew up with her family, in their place of origin (Thessaloniki), but when she turned 18 years old, she moved to Athens, where she studied fashion design. Along with her studies, Chopsonidou began to work as a model, with the Cristi Krana Model Agency.

Chopsonidou won the title of Star Hellas in 2006. After that, she represented Greece at the Miss Universe 2006 pageant, in Los Angeles, California, U,S.

Personal life
In December 2009, Chopsonidou married Greek professional basketball player Vassilis Spanoulis, with a civil marriage, and on 24 June 2011 the couple had a religious marriage. Together, the couple have six children: Thanasis Spanoulis (born 2 January 2010), Vassilis Spanoulis Jr. (5 April 2012), Dimitris Spanoulis (5 June 2013), Emilia Spanouli (3 August 2015), Anastasia Spanouli (25 September 2017) and another daughter (20 January 2020).

External links
Twitter Account

Ace Models
7merestv Interview
Star Hellas

1983 births
Living people
Greek beauty pageant winners
Greek female models
Miss Universe 2006 contestants
Models from Thessaloniki
Models from Athens